Hubbard Hall, also known as Kellogg House and Elizabethtown Community House, was a historic home located at Elizabethtown in Essex County, New York.  It was a -story wood-frame building in the Queen Anne style.  Hubbard Hall was originally built about 1840 as a typical five-by-two-bay Federal / Greek Revival–style structure and extensively remodeled in 1895. It featured multiple gables and dormers and interesting roof lines. A porch extended across three quarters of the front facade.  In 1925 it was converted from a residence to a community hospital.  A 2-story wing was added in 1946.

It was listed on the National Register of Historic Places in 1999. However, the building was destroyed by a fire on January 11, 2011

References

Houses on the National Register of Historic Places in New York (state)
Queen Anne architecture in New York (state)
Houses in Essex County, New York
National Register of Historic Places in Essex County, New York